There is a variety of baked pasta dishes, also called by their Italian name, pasta al forno:

 Lasagne in Italy
 Vincisgrassi
 Timballo in Italy
 Macaroni casserole in northern Europe, imaqarrun in Malta
 Macaroni schotel in Indonesia
 Pastitsio, oven macaroni, or bechamel macaroni, in Greek, Cypriot, Egyptian, and Maltese cuisine
 Baked ziti in Italian-American cuisine
 Giouvetsi in Greek cuisine
 Johnny Marzetti, a Midwestern American dish
 Kugel, an Ashkenazi Jewish dish
 Macaroni and cheese or macaroni cheese in American and British cuisine
 Macaroni pie in various European and North American cuisines, with or without a crust

See also

 al forno
 Ptitim, where the pasta itself is toasted
 Vermicelli is often browned before cooking in the Levant